Henryka Krystyna Krzywonos-Strycharska was the former head of the Gdańsk transport workers. She is noted for playing a role in strikes and protests in 1980 Gdańsk. The authorities later beat her causing her to miscarry, as she had been pregnant at the time. Afterward she became involved in "family orphanages" and adopted 12 orphans with her third husband.

References 

Commanders of the Order of Polonia Restituta
Polish dissidents
Politicians from Gdańsk
Members of the Polish Sejm 2015–2019
Members of the Polish Sejm 2019–2023